is a former Japanese football player. He played for Japan national team.

Club career
Minowa was born in Kawasaki on June 2, 1976. After graduating from Sendai University, he joined Júbilo Iwata in 1999. However he did not play in the match, he moved to his local club Kawasaki Frontale in September 2000. The club was relegated to J2 League end of 2000 season. From 2001, although the club in J2 League, he became a regular player as defender. The club won the champions in 2004 and was promoted to J1 League. The club won the 2nd place 2006 J1 League and 2007 J.League Cup. In 2008, he lost his opportunity to play for injury and moved to Consadole Sapporo in June. The club was relegated to J2 League end of 2008 season. From 2009, he could not play for injury and he left the club end of 2010 season. He announced his retirement in September 2011.

National team career
On April 25, 2005, when Minowa was 29 aged, he debuted for Japan national team in a friendly match against Ukraine.

Club statistics

National team statistics

References

External links

Japan National Football Team Database

1976 births
Living people
Sendai University alumni
Association football people from Kanagawa Prefecture
Japanese footballers
Japan international footballers
J1 League players
J2 League players
Júbilo Iwata players
Kawasaki Frontale players
Hokkaido Consadole Sapporo players
Association football defenders